Dellroy is a village in western Carroll County, Ohio, United States. The population was 268 at the 2020 census. It is part of the Canton–Massillon metropolitan area.

History
The village was established in 1849 as "Cannonsburg." It was renamed circa 1878 to Dellroy. The origin of the name "Dellroy" is disputed.

Geography
Dellroy is located at  (40.555227, -81.199436).

Dellroy lies at the junction of Ohio State Routes 39 and 542.

Demographics

2010 census
As of the census of 2010, there were 356 people, 134 households, and 94 families living in the village. The racial makeup of the village was 97.2% White, 0.6% African American, 1.4% Native American, and 0.8% from two or more races. Hispanic or Latino of any race were 0.6% of the population.

There were 134 households, of which 33.6% had children under the age of 18 living with them, 54.5% were married couples living together, 11.2% had a female householder with no husband present, 4.5% had a male householder with no wife present, and 29.9% were non-families. 20.9% of all households were made up of individuals, and 9.7% had someone living alone who was 65 years of age or older. The average household size was 2.66 and the average family size was 3.05.

The median age in the village was 38 years. 25.6% of residents were under the age of 18; 5.9% were between the ages of 18 and 24; 26.9% were from 25 to 44; 24.4% were from 45 to 64; and 17.1% were 65 years of age or older. The gender makeup of the village was 48.6% male and 51.4% female.

2000 census
As of the census of 2000, there were 294 people, 121 households, and 83 families living in the village. The population density was 1,714.8 people per square mile (667.7/km2). There were 130 housing units at an average density of 758.2 per square mile (295.3/km2). The racial makeup of the village was 99.32% White, 0.34% Native American and 0.34% Pacific Islander.

There were 121 households, out of which 32.2% had children under the age of 18 living with them, 56.2% were married couples living together, 10.7% had a female householder with no husband present, and 30.6% were non-families. 28.9% of all households were made up of individuals, and 12.4% had someone living alone who was 65 years of age or older. The average household size was 2.43 and the average family size was 3.00.

In the village, the population was spread out, with 26.2% under the age of 18, 7.1% from 18 to 24, 29.6% from 25 to 44, 19.0% from 45 to 64, and 18.0% who were 65 years of age or older. The median age was 38 years. For every 100 females there were 90.9 males. For every 100 females age 18 and over, there were 90.4 males.

The median income for a household in the village was $27,344, and the median income for a family was $31,875. Males had a median income of $27,292 versus $20,833 for females. The per capita income for the village was $15,149. About 8.8% of families and 9.1% of the population were below the poverty line, including 7.4% of those under the age of eighteen and 3.6% of those 65 or over.

Government

The current office holders and end of their terms are

Mayor:
 Douglas S. Ruby, December 31, 2015

Clerk-Treasurer
 Amy Graham, March 31, 2016

Council
 Donald Williams, December 31, 2013
 Joe Mabie, December 31, 2013
 Rebecca Harkless, December 31, 2013
 B. Kay Onstott, December 31, 2013
 Micah Williams, December 31, 2015
 Beth Reed, December 31, 2015

Education
Students attend the Carrollton Exempted Village School District including the Dellroy Elementary School.

Notable people

Vince Costello - former American football linebacker
Mariah O'Brien - cover girl on Alice In Chains Album Dirt

References

External links

 History of Monroe Township
 Dellroy History in pictures

Villages in Carroll County, Ohio
Villages in Ohio
Populated places established in 1849
1849 establishments in Ohio